Ceratocilia is a genus of moths of the family Crambidae.

Species
Ceratocilia damonalis (Walker, 1859)
Ceratocilia falsalis (Schaus, 1912)
Ceratocilia femoralis (Hampson, 1912)
Ceratocilia gilippusalis (Walker, 1859)
Ceratocilia liberalis Guenée, 1854
Ceratocilia maceralis (Walker, 1859)
Ceratocilia pallidipuncta (Dognin, 1905)
Ceratocilia sixolalis (Schaus, 1912)

References

Spilomelinae
Crambidae genera
Taxa named by Hans Georg Amsel